The 2021 Challenger La Manche was a professional tennis tournament played on indoor hard courts. It was the 28th edition of the tournament which was part of the 2021 ATP Challenger Tour. It took place in Cherbourg, France between 8 and 14 February 2021.

Singles main-draw entrants

Seeds

 1 Rankings are as of 1 February 2021.

Other entrants
The following players received wildcards into the singles main draw:
  Kenny de Schepper
  Evan Furness
  Matteo Martineau

The following players received entry into the singles main draw as alternates:
  Lukáš Klein
  Alex Molčan
  Nino Serdarušić

The following players received entry from the qualifying draw:
  Titouan Droguet
  Jonáš Forejtek
  Michael Geerts
  Nathaniel Lammons

The following player received entry as a lucky loser:
  Corentin Denolly

Champions

Singles

 Ruben Bemelmans def.  Lukáš Rosol 6–4, 6–4.

Doubles

 Lukáš Klein /  Alex Molčan def.  Antoine Hoang /  Albano Olivetti 1–6, 7–5, [10–6].

References

2021 ATP Challenger Tour
2021
February 2021 sports events in France
2021 in French tennis